A column can buckle due to its own weight with no other direct forces acting on it, in a failure mode called self-buckling. In conventional column buckling problems, the self-weight is often neglected since it is assumed to be small when compared to the applied axial loads. However, when this assumption is not valid, it is important to take the self-buckling into account.

Elastic buckling of a "heavy" column i.e., column buckling under its own weight, was first investigated by Greenhill at 1881. He found that a free-standing, vertical column, with density , Young's modulus , and cross-sectional area , will buckle under its own weight if its height exceeds a certain critical value:
 

where  is the acceleration due to gravity,  is the second moment of area of the beam cross section.

One interesting example for the use of the equation was suggested by Greenhill in his paper. He estimated the maximal height of a pine tree, and found it cannot grow over 300-ft tall. This length sets the maximum height for trees on earth if we assume the trees to be prismatic and the branches are neglected.

Mathematical derivation 

Suppose a uniform column fixed in a vertical direction at its lowest point, and carried to a height , in which the vertical position becomes unstable and flexure begins.

The column is slightly curved under its own weight, so the curve  describes the deflection of the beam in the  direction at some position . Looking at any point on the column, we can write the moment equilibrium:
 

where the right-hand side of the equation is the moment of the weight of BP about P.

According to Euler–Bernoulli beam theory:
 

Where  is the Young's modulus of elasticity of the substance,  is the second moment of area.

Therefore, the differential equation of the central line of BP is:
 

Differentiating with respect to x, we get
 

We get that the governing equation is the third order linear differential equation with a variable coefficient. The way to solve the problem is to use new variables  and :
 

Then, the equation transforms to the Bessel equation
 

The solution of the transformed equation is 

Where  is the Bessel function of the first kind. Then, the solution of the original equation is:
 

Now, we will use the boundary conditions:                                                        
 No moment at 
 Fixed at          
From the second B.C., we get that the critical length in which a vertical column will buckle under its own weight is:
 

Using  , the first zero of the Bessel function of the first kind of order ,  can be approximated to:

Euler's mistake 

The column under its own weight was considered by Euler in three famous papers (1778a, 1778b, 1778c). In his first paper, Euler (1778a) concluded that the column simply supported under its own weight  would never lose its stability. In his second paper on this topic Euler (1778b)  described his previous result as paradoxical and suspicious (see Panovko and Gubanova (1965); Nicolai, (1955); Todhunter and Pierson (1866) on this topic). In the next, third in series, paper, Euler (1778c) found that he had made a conceptual mistake and the “infinite buckling load” conclusion was proved to be wrong. Unfortunately, however, he made a numerical mistake and instead of the first eigenvalue, he calculated a second one. Correct solutions were derived by Dinnik (1912), 132 years later, as well as  Willers (1941), Engelhardt (1954) and Frich-Fay (1966). Numerical solution with arbitrary accuracy was given by Eisenberger (1991).

222 years later, after Euler’s mistake in 1778, in the year 2000,  Elishakoff  revisited this famous problem and derived closed-form solutions for the first time, for self-buckling problems, by resorting to semi-inverse method. Numerous other problems are treated in his monograph.

See also 
 Buckling
 Bending moment
 Euler's critical load
 Bending
 Euler–Bernoulli beam theory

External links 

 Advanced Topic in Column Buckling, MIT Open-Course-Ware
 Self-buckling detailed derivation in the Opera Magistris v3.7 online reference Chapter 15, section 2.2.4.1, .

References 

Elasticity (physics)
Materials science
Mechanical failure modes
Structural analysis
Mechanics